The 1966 municipal election was held October 19, 1966, in Edmonton, Alberta, Canada, to elect a mayor and twelve aldermen to sit on Edmonton City Council and seven trustees to sit on each of the public and separate school boards.  The electorate also decided three plebiscite questions.

The electoral system used was First past the post for the mayoral election and Plurality block voting for the election of councillors and trustees. Voters could cast as many as votes as the members to be elected.

Voter turnout

There were 125084 ballots cast out of 208716 eligible voters, for a voter turnout of 59.9%.

Results

(bold indicates elected, italics indicate incumbent)

Mayor

Aldermen

Public school trustees

Separate (Catholic) school trustees

Plebiscites

Bridge

Should Council pass bylaw No. 2789 to borrow by debentures $5,750,000.00 as the City share of a cross-river bridge and approaches at 72nd Street to arterial standards from 98th Avenue to 101st Avenue, to freeway standards from 101st Avenue to 112th Avenue and to arterial standards from 112th Avenue to 118th Avenue?
Yes - 53750
No - 24062

Fluoridation of Water

Should Council pass bylaw No. 2889 allowing fluoride for the prevention of toothdecay to be added to the City water supply sufficient to bring the fluoride content of City water up to the level of one part fluoride to one million parts of water?
Yes - 71618
No - 46255

Allowing Events on Sundays

Should Council pass bylaw No. 2886 as authorized by The Alberta Lord's Day Act allowing certain public games, contests or sports at which a fee is charged on Sunday afternoons between the hours of half past one and six o’clock?
Yes - 93310
No - 25258

References

City of Edmonton: Edmonton Elections

1966
1966 elections in Canada
1966 in Alberta